In chemistry, mercury nitrides are chemical compounds that contain mercury cations and nitride anions. Binary mercury nitrides, e.g. , are not well characterized and are probably unstable in the condensed phase under ordinary conditions. This reddish solid adopts a network structure consisting of  tetrahedra linked by nitrate ligands.

References

Mercury compounds
Nitrides
II-V compounds